Timothy Joe Long (born April 20, 1963) is an American football player and coach. He was drafted by the Minnesota Vikings as a left tackle in 1985 and also played for the San Francisco 49ers of the National Football League (NFL) as a center in 1987.  Also signed and played guard for the Indianapolis Colts in 1988.

Career
Long attended Bradley Central High School in Cleveland, Tennessee, graduating in 1981. He enrolled at Memphis State University, and played college football for the Memphis State Tigers. In 1984, he was named an honorable mention on the Associated Press All-America Team.  Selected as a "Grid God" in US Magazine.

The Minnesota Vikings of the National Football League (NFL) selected Long in the third round, with the 66th overall selection, of the 1985 NFL Draft. He played in preseason games for the Vikings, Indianapolis Colts, and San Francisco 49ers. In 1987, he played in three regular season games for the 49ers. His career ended prematurely due to injuries.

After his retirement from playing, Long volunteer coached the offensive line for Briarcrest Christian School for 9 seasons.  Coached Michael Oher who was portrayed in the movie The Blind Side and also coached both of his sons who later attended the University of Georgia on football scholarships.

Personal life
Both of Long's sons, Austin & Hunter Long, played college football for the University of Georgia.

References

External links
 

1963 births
Living people
People from Cleveland, Tennessee
Players of American football from Tennessee
Memphis Tigers football players
San Francisco 49ers players
American football centers